Deborah Rennard is an American actress, writer and producer, best known for her role as Sly Lovegren in Dallas (1981–1991).

Life and career
Rennard was born in Los Angeles, California. In 1981 she was cast in a recurring role on Dallas as J.R. Ewing's loyal secretary Sylvia "Sly" Lovegren. She appeared in the series from 1981 to 1991 and later was cast in the 1996 film J.R. Returns. After Dallas, she had role in daytime soap opera Days of Our Lives, and guest starred on Silk Stalkings, Kung Fu: The Legend Continues, and Due South. In film, she appeared as Harmony in the 1986 movie Land of Doom and as Cynthia alongside Jean-Claude Van Damme in the 1990 movie Lionheart. She left acting and as of late 1990s began career as stage producer.

In 1997, Rennard married director Paul Haggis.

Filmography

Film

Television

References

External links

American television actresses
Living people
American soap opera actresses
American film actresses
20th-century American actresses
Actresses from Los Angeles
21st-century American actresses
Year of birth missing (living people)